Canadian Forces Base Kingston (also CFB Kingston) is a Canadian Forces Base operated by the Canadian Army located in Kingston, Ontario.

History

The Barriefield Military Camp, commonly called Camp Barriefield, was established as a military base at the outbreak of the First World War in 1914 on the east bank of the Cataraqui River opposite the city of Kingston in the village of Barriefield.  Located north of King's Highway 2, the name of the military base and village was in honour of the Royal Navy's Rear-Admiral Sir Robert Barrie who served during the War of 1812.

In 1937 the base expanded to the south side of King's Highway 2 with the opening of the Vimy Barracks, named in honour of the Battle of Vimy Ridge.  The Vimy Barracks became home to the Royal Canadian Corps of Signals which relocated to the Barriefield Military Camp from the Borden Military Camp.  The Signal Training Centre, later renamed the Royal Canadian School of Signals was also established at the base.

The Barriefield Military Camp continued to expand as one of Canada's largest training bases when the Royal Canadian Ordnance Corps established a training centre during the Second World War.  Following the war, the original part of Barriefield Military Camp on the north side of the King's Highway 2 was renamed the McNaughton Barracks in honour of the Canadian Army's General A.G.L. McNaughton who served during the First and Second World Wars.  From 1945 to 1969 the McNaughton Barracks were host to the Royal Canadian Electrical and Mechanical Engineers School.

The base was renamed to Canadian Forces Base Kingston (CFB Kingston) in 1966 in the lead-up to the February 1968 unification of the Canadian Army, Royal Canadian Navy and Royal Canadian Air Force to form the Canadian Armed Forces.  CFB Kingston was placed under Training Command and was responsible for providing a training facilities and support services to its integral units and lodger units.

In September 1975, Training Command was disbanded and the base was transferred to Canadian Forces Training System.  The Royal Military College of Canada, the National Defence College, the Canadian Land Force Command and Staff College and the Canadian Forces School of Communications and Electronics were some of the units supported by the base and under the authority of the commander of CFB Kingston.  On September 1, 1988, the 1st Canadian Division Headquarters was established to serve as a staging base for the deployment of troops and materiel on active operations; in this role it supported Operation Friction which was Canada's support to the United Nations for the Persian Gulf War in 1991.

On March 30, 1995, responsibility for CFB Kingston was transferred to Land Force Command, now known as the Canadian Army (since August 2011).

On June 26, 1997, Air Command reorganized by disbanding the 10 Tactical Air Group and replacing this unit with the newly formed 1 Wing.  The headquarters for 1 Wing was relocated to CFB Kingston, however, the unit's 6 tactical helicopter squadrons flying the CH-146 Griffon were spread out at Canadian Forces bases across the country.

Lodger units
Primarily a training base, CFB Kingston is home to the following lodger units:

 Canadian Army
 Canadian Army Doctrine and Training Centre (CADTC)
 1st Canadian Division, Headquarters
 Peace Support Training Centre (PSTC)
 Princess of Wales' Own Regiment (PWOR)
 Communications and Electronics Branch
 Canadian Forces School of Communications and Electronics (CFSCE)
 Canadian Forces Joint Signal Regiment
 21 Electronic Warfare Regiment
 772 Electronic Warfare Squadron
 2 Electronic Warfare Squadron
 Canadian Forces Crypto Maintenance Unit
 Royal Canadian Air Force
 1 Wing (commonly referred to as 1 Wing Kingston)
 Royal Canadian Navy
 
 CSTC HMCS Ontario - Sea Cadet Summer Training Centre
 Canadian Forces Joint Operations Group
 Canadian Forces Joint Support Group
 Canadian Defence Academy
 Canadian Forces National Counter-Intelligence Unit Detachment Kingston
 1 Dental Unit — Detachment Kingston
 33 Canadian Forces Health Services Centre
 Military Post Office 305 Vimy Post Office
 Civilian Human Resources Office
 Kingston Garrison Learning and Career Centre
 Dispute Resolution Centre
 Canadian Forces Housing Agency
 2 Military Police Regiment Detachment Kingston
 Military Communications and Electronics Museum
 Royal Military College of Canada; CFB Kingston is the base designated to support RMC, located nearby at Point Frederick
 Garrison Golf and Curling Club
 Kingston Military Community Sports Center (PSP)

Architecture
CFB Kingston includes several recognized and classified federal heritage buildings on the Register of the Government of Canada Heritage Buildings.

 McNaughton Barracks
Canadian Forces Health Services Clinic, Building MB-62 Recognized - 2002
 Lewis Hall, Building MB39 Recognized - 1996
 Sherman Hall, Building MB37 Recognized - 1996
Vimy Barracks
Barracks Block, Building VB-7 Recognized - 2002
Beament Hall, Building VB-2 Recognized - 1996
Carruthers Hall, Building VB-1 Recognized - 1996
Forde Building VB-16 Recognized - 1997
McKee Hall, Building VB-6 Recognized - 1996
Officer's Mess Building VC1 Recognized - 1996

Awards
CFB Kingston received an award from the Ontario Power Authority's for their leadership in pursuing energy efficiency. CFB Kingston and Direct Energy partnered in 2005 to create the largest Federal Building Initiative project ever conducted in Canada, resulting in a $21-million energy performance contract (EPC) expected to save the base more than $2 million annually in utility costs. At CFB Kingston, energy efficiency measures cover a number of base-wide initiatives, such as lighting upgrades, improved building controls and water conservation.

References

External links
 Department of National Defence Canada - CFB Kingston
 Official site for 1 Wing Kingston
 Military Communications and Electronics Museum
 Peace Support Training Centre

Kingston
Buildings and structures in Kingston, Ontario